The toothless catfish (Anodontiglanis dahli) is a species of catfish (order Siluriformes) of the family Plotosidae. This fish originates from northern Australia, including Fitzroy, Daly, East Alligator, Roper, Mitchell, and Archer Rivers, in lentic and lotic freshwater habitats. It grows up to about 40.0 centimetres (15.7 in) TL.

The toothless catfish lives in clear, flowing waters. It has been reported to be solitary, but it also often forms aggregations around log snags or in deeper rock pools. It also occurs in sandy bottoms around the cover of woody debris and in flooded lagoons. This fish feeds on aquatic insects, mollusks, prawns, and bottom detritus by thrusting its snout into the sandy bottom. Nothing is specific is known about the breeding biology, but it probably spawns early in the wet season. This fish most definitely does have teeth (in its pharynx).

References

Plotosidae
Freshwater fish of Australia
toothless catfish